Guy Hulett Watkins was a lawyer and U.S. Army Lieutenant Colonel during the American Civil War. He was born in Towanda, Pennsylvania, and completed his education at a seminary in Lima, New York. Thereafter, he entered the law practice of his father, William Watkins. He was admitted to the bar on September 9, 1853. In 1859, he was elected district attorney. He had not finished his term at the time of his entrance into the Union Army. He was killed during the Siege of Petersburg, Virginia on or about June 19, 1864.

Sources 
 History of the One Hundred Forty-First Regiment Pennsylvania Volunteers. Craft, David:1885 

Union Army officers
1831 births
1864 deaths
People from Towanda, Pennsylvania
19th-century American lawyers
Military personnel from Pennsylvania
Union military personnel killed in the American Civil War